Old Man Rhythm is a 1935 American musical film directed by Edward Ludwig from a screenplay by Sig Herzig and Ernest Pagano, based on a story by Herzig, Lewis Gensler, and Don Hartman. The musical director was Roy Webb, with music composed by Lewis Gensler and lyrics by Johnny Mercer.  The film stars Charles "Buddy" Rogers, George Barbier, Barbara Kent, and Grace Bradley.

Cast
Charles "Buddy" Rogers - Johnny Roberts
George Barbier - John Roberts, Sr.
Barbara Kent - Edith Warren
Grace Bradley - Marion Beecher
Betty Grable - Sylvia
Eric Blore - 'Phil' Phillips
Bess Flowers - Miss Martin
Erik Rhodes - Frank Rochet
Ronald Graham - Ronald

References

External links

1935 films
RKO Pictures films
Films directed by Edward Ludwig
1935 musical comedy films
American musical comedy films
American black-and-white films
1930s American films